Regional League Division 2 North Eastern Region is the 7th season of the League competition since its establishment in 2009. It is in the third tier of the Thai football league system. The league winners and runners up qualified for the 2015 Regional League Division 2 champions league round.

Changes from Last Season

Team Changes

Promoted Clubs

No club was promoted to the Thai Division 1 League. Last years league champions Ubon Ratchathani, runners up Udon Thani failed to qualify from the 2014 Regional League Division 2 champions league round.

Relegated Clubs

Khonkaen and Roi Et United were relegated from the 2014 Thai Division 1 League.

Renamed Clubs

 Nong Bua Lamphu renamed Nong Bua Pitchaya.
 Ubon UMT F.C. renamed Ubon Ratchathani F.C.
 Mukdahan City renamed Mukdahan Lamkhong.
 Mahasarakham United renamed Mahasarakham.
 Loei City renamed Loei City R-Airlines.

Expansion Clubs

Khon Kaen United and Ubon UMT United joined the newly expanded league setup.

Stadium and locations

League table

References

External links
 Kondivision 2

Regional League North-East Division seasons